Nick Hall may refer to:
Nick Hall (badminton) (born 1970), badminton competitor for New Zealand
Nick Hall (singer) (born 1973), English singer-songwriter
 Nick Vine Hall (1944–2006), Australian genealogist

See also
Nicholas Hall, Australian jockey